The United States Coast Guard Police (CGPD) are law enforcement units stationed at certain shore facilities of the United States Coast Guard.

Uniform

Officers wear a modified Operational Dress Uniform (ODU) with "CGPD" collar devices in lieu of their rank. There is a CGPD shoulder patch worn on both shoulders, a CGPD badge/shield worn on the left breast and the CGPD patch repeated on the blue baseball cap. Sometimes, equipment vests with "USCG" or "USCG POLICE" are worn over the top.

Structure 

CGPDs are overseen by a Command Security Officer, who is responsible for physical security aboard shoreside facilities .  

The position of Chief of Police is usually held by a Chief Warrant Officer (W-2) or Chief Petty Officer (E-7), who oversees the day-to-day activities of a CGPD.  

A Petty Officer First Class (E-6) usually holds the position of Deputy Chief of Police.  Shift supervisors are usually assigned by seniority.  

Police officers usually consist of Coast Guardsmen with the rank of E-3 to E-7. CGPD personnel attend formal law enforcement training through the Federal Law Enforcement Training Center and/or other civilian police academies. Select personnel may also attend advanced training.

See also

Department of Defense police
Maritime Law Enforcement Academy
Maritime Law Enforcement Specialist
U.S. Coast Guard Intelligence
U.S. Coast Guard Investigative Service (CGIS)
United States Air Force Security Forces
Department of the Air Force Police (civilian)
United States Army Military Police Corps
Department of the Army Police (civilian)
Master-at-arms (United States Navy)
Department of the Navy Police (civilian)
United States Marine Corps Police (civilian)

References

External links
CGPD Training Center Petaluma
CGPD Training Center Cape May
CGPD Base Support Kodiak
CGPD USCG Yard, Baltimore

United States Coast Guard
Coast Guard Police
Coast Guard Police
Coast Guard Police